In Belgium, there are ten official public holidays. Other particular days are also celebrated, but these are not official public holidays and employers are not obliged to give their employees a day off. However, some employers do award a day's holiday in accordance with union negotiations.

Public holidays

In addition to the above, the same legal text names all Sundays as public holidays (which is why Easter and Pentecost, which always fall on Sundays, are "feasted" by extending the Sunday holiday to the following Monday).

Particular days celebrated in Belgium that are not official public holidays

The days of the three communities are holidays for their civil servants and for employees of institutions controlled, supervised or financed by them (e.g. municipalities, universities) and may also be observed by banks in the community concerned. King's Feast is a holiday observed by all (i.e. federal, community or regional, provincial and local) administrations, including some of the schools they organize.

See also
 Public holidays in the Netherlands
 Public holidays in France

References 

 
Belgium
Holidays